Asoo Billa (2001) is a typical Pakistani Punjabi language 'masala' action revenge film. It became a sizeable and surprising hit in 2001. This Pakistani film is directed by the Punjabi film director Hasnain, who has produced films like Nikah (1998 film) and Naukar Tey Malik (1982).

Plot
Asoo's (Shaan) father, who works in a local godown or warehouse finds that "poe-durr" (heroin) is being smuggled from the godown and he being the upright, virtuous (idiotic) type decides that he absolutely must go to the police to blow the whistle on the nefarious drug smuggling operation going on under his own very nose at the behest of his own employers.

Asoo's dad meets a terrible fate, as the police turns out to be a party to the drug smuggling ring instead of rewarding the poor man for his civic sense and courage, thrashes and beats him to a pulp. Then the old man is fraudulently charged with the theft of Rupees 200,000, humiliated and thrown into prison. Meanwhile, a shell-shocked Asoo arrives at the police station where he is told that unless he manages to get hold of the money that his father has been accused of stealing, matters would get out of hand. When poor Asoo fails to turn up with the money on time the corrupt officer turns up at his home and humiliates Asoo’s mother and hits her and worse causes the dupatta to fall off her head. This indignity for Asoo is the last straw and as he arrives at the Police Station in a fury. It is only to find his dad being pummeled into a meatball. This for young Asoo is too much to take, and all of a sudden, the mild mannered Asoo is transformed into a drooling, axe-wielding maniac who proceeds to bludgeon to death what seems like the entire local police force.

The next day in court, Asoo pleads guilty to murder and is sentenced to death so vehemently by the judge that he snubs his nib while writing the word death ... .deep, meaningful symbolism Lollywood style! Now the blood bath begins as his friend Ghiasia whisks Asoo away from jail in a deadly grenade attack. Asoo takes refuge with Sana the gold-hearted prostitute who shows up habitually to launch into an  energetic dance complete with serious pelvic thrusting and torso twisting. Asoo Billa becomes the local Robin Hood, stealing from the rich to provide for the destitute and now it remains to be seen if he can complete his mission of destroying all his enemies before he is himself struck down and it doesn't take a genius to guess exactly what does transpire later.

Cast 
 Shaan Shahid
 Sana Fakhar
 Babar Ali
 Nargis
 Humayun Qureshi
 Tariq Shah
 Naghma

References

External links
Watch film Asoo Billa (2001) on YouTube

2001 films
Punjabi-language Pakistani films
Pakistani crime action films
2000s Punjabi-language films